Louis George P. Appéré (born 26 March 1999) is a Scottish footballer who plays as a forward for EFL League Two club Northampton Town. He made his senior debut in August 2017.

Early life
Louis Appéré was born in Perth on 26 March 1999. He grew up in Cupar, Fife, where he attended Bell Baxter High School. He started playing football for East Fife Junior Supporters' Club at the age of 9 and later spent two years as a youth player with Dunfermline Athletic. He then joined Cupar-based AM Soccer, progressing through from the youth system.

Club career
Appéré began the 2015–16 season playing youth football, before progressing to AM Soccer's adult amateur team as well as appearing as a trialist for Raith Rovers' under-20 development team. In May 2016 he went to Italy for a trial with A.S. Roma after AM Soccer owner Austin MacPhee brought a YouTube video of the player to Roma's attention. In July 2016, Appéré signed for Scottish Championship club Dundee United, whose manager Ray McKinnon had previously had him on trial at Raith.

Appéré made his first team debut for Dundee United as a substitute in a Scottish Challenge Cup tie against Cowdenbeath on 15 August 2017. He signed a new two-year contract with the club in May 2018.

In January 2019, Appéré joined Scottish Junior Football East Region Super League club Broughty Athletic on loan until the end of the 2018–19 season. After scoring 22 goals in 20 appearances for Broughty, he returned to Dundee United and was able to break into the first team squad on a regular basis.

He scored his first goal for Dundee United on 19 July 2019 in a Scottish League Cup tie against Cowdenbeath. His first league goal came on 30 August 2019, the second goal in a 6–2 victory in the Dundee derby against Dundee. On 17 October 2019, the club announced that Appéré had extended his contract with Dundee United until the summer of 2022. He went on to score 6 goals in 33 appearances during the 2019-20 season as Dundee United won the  Championship title.

Following United's promotion to the Scottish Premiership, Appéré initially struggled for playing time. He scored his first top-flight goal against St Johnstone on 12 January 2021, and also assisted Lawrence Shankland to score from 53 yards in the same match.

Northampton Town
On 31 January 2022, Appéré joined EFL League Two club Northampton Town for an undisclosed fee, signing a two-and-a-half year deal.

International career
Appéré was born in Scotland and is of French descent, and holds both passports. He received his first call-up to the Scotland under-21 team for scheduled fixtures in March 2020 against Croatia and Greece, only for the matches to be postponed due to the COVID-19 pandemic.

Career statistics

References

External links

Living people
1999 births
Footballers from Perth, Scotland
People from Cupar
People educated at Bell Baxter High School
Scottish footballers
Scottish people of French descent
Association football forwards
Dundee United F.C. players
Broughty Athletic F.C. players
Northampton Town F.C. players
Scottish Junior Football Association players
Scottish Professional Football League players